Jure Meglič (born 18 October 1984 in Kranj) is a Slovenian slalom canoeist who started competing at the international level in 2001. He represented Azerbaijan from 2014 until his retirement in 2016.

He won a bronze medal in the K1 event at the 2010 ICF Canoe Slalom World Championships in Tacen. He also won five medals at the European Championships (3 golds, 1 silver and 1 bronze).

Meglič finished 14th in the K1 event at the 2016 Summer Olympics in Rio de Janeiro.

World Cup individual podiums

References

 2010 ICF Canoe Slalom World Championships 12 September 2010 K1 men's final results. - accessed 12 September 2010.

External links
 
 

Living people
Slovenian male canoeists
Azerbaijani male canoeists
1984 births
Canoeists at the 2016 Summer Olympics
Olympic canoeists of Azerbaijan
Naturalized citizens of Azerbaijan
Azerbaijani people of Slovenian descent
Medalists at the ICF Canoe Slalom World Championships